Spalacopsis is a genus of beetles in the family Cerambycidae, containing the following species:

 Spalacopsis chemsaki Tyson, 1973
 Spalacopsis filum (Klug, 1829)
 Spalacopsis fusca Gahan, 1892
 Spalacopsis grandis (Chevrolat, 1862)
 Spalacopsis howdeni Tyson, 1970
 Spalacopsis lobata Breuning, 1942
 Spalacopsis macra Tyson, 1973
 Spalacopsis ornatipennis Fisher, 1935
 Spalacopsis phantasma Bates, 1885
 Spalacopsis protensa (Pascoe, 1871)
 Spalacopsis similis Gahan, 1892
 Spalacopsis spinipennis Fisher, 1936
 Spalacopsis stolata Newman, 1842
 Spalacopsis suffusa Newman, 1842
 Spalacopsis texana Casey, 1891
 Spalacopsis unicolor Tyson, 1973
 Spalacopsis variegata Bates, 1880

References

 
Agapanthiini